Szczęsny (feminine: Szczęsna), Szczesny, or Sczesny is a Polish given name and surname, meaning "lucky". It is the Polish equivalent of the Czech and Slovak surname Šťastný.

Notable people

Surname 
 Bernard Szczęsny (1919–1999), Polish activist
  (born 1949), Polish journalist
 Maciej Szczęsny (born 1965), Polish football goalkeeper
 Piotr Szczęsny (1963–2017), Polish activist
 Roman Szczęsny (1929–2000), Polish geographer
 Stefan Szczesny (born 1951), German artist
 Wojciech Szczęsny (born 1990), Polish football goalkeeper
 Matt Sczesny (1932–2009), American baseball, manager, and scout

Given name 
 Saint Zygmunt Szczęsny Feliński (1822–1895), Archbishop of Warsaw
 Antoni Szczęsny Godlewski, (1923–1944) Polish legendary soldier
 Jan Szczęsny Herburt (1567–1616), Polish-Ukrainian political writer and diplomat
 Szczęsny Potocki (1753–1805), Polish military commander

Places 
 Szczęsna, a village in Poland

See also
 

Polish-language surnames
Polish given names